Peski is a rural locality (a selo) and the administrative center of Peskovskoye Rural Settlement, Povorinsky District, Voronezh Oblast, Russia. The population was  6,953 as of 2010. There are 49 streets.

Geography 
Peski is located 23 km northeast of Povorino (the district's administrative centre) by road. Mazurka is the nearest rural locality.

References 

Rural localities in Povorinsky District